The Mašićka Šagovina killings refers to the murder of at least 55 Serbs on 18-19 December 1991, by the 108th and 121st Brigades of the Croatian National Guard (ZNG) in the village of Mašićka Šagovina during the Croatian War of Independence.

Events and killings
Mašićka Šagovina is a village near the municipality of Okučani, in western Slavonia, Croatia. According to the 1991 census, there were 209 inhabitants in Masicka Sagovina, of which 189 were Serbs, 16 Croats and 4 Yugoslavs.

On the night of 18 December 1991, Croatian forces prepared to launch an attack on the village, which had been held by Krajina Serb forces and was considered an important military fort. The main participants in this operation were members of the 108th and 121st Brigades of the Croatian National Guard (ZNG) but also included other special forces. It was part of the wider military operation conducted by the Croatian Army against the Yugoslav People's Army and SAO Western Slavonia Territorial Defense Forces (TO) known as Operation Hurricane-91. According to Croatian sources, the action was planned by Brigadier Josip Mikšić, the then commander of the 121st Brigade, and the attack was commanded by Colonel Ante Šolić. Part of the brigade were also led by Pero Jelančić.

Members of the 108th and 121st Brigades of the National Guard and special forces from the 363-strong "Svileni" group took over the village. According to Serbian sources, 55 people were killed, including 31 civilians. According to the testimonies of survivors, ZNG forces set fire to houses and some twenty civilians hid in a basement. Several were killed and injured when an explosive device was thrown into the basement. Members of the TO along with civilians were subsequently killed after they came out and surrendered. More local civilians were killed once the village was captured; some reportedly were tortured. By the order of the Croatian army, 28 corpses were buried in Mašićka Šagovina, most of them by name, and they were collected and buried by their relatives. Initially the remains of six people were exhumed from the graves. In 2013, the remains of 19 more victims were exhumed from the location of which 14 have been identified.

Croatian losses from the operation battle amounted to 13 with dozens injured. In Croatia, the action in Mašićka Šagovina is seen as "one of the first heroic battles in the Homeland War".

No one has been held accountable for the atrocities.

References

1991 crimes in Croatia
Croatian war crimes in the Croatian War of Independence
December 1991 events in Europe
History of the Serbs of Croatia
Massacres in 1991
Massacres in Croatia
Massacres of Serbs
Mass murder in 1991
Massacres in the Croatian War of Independence